Poetry International may refer to:

 Poetry International Web, a webzine and poetry archive of the Poetry International Foundation
 Poetry International Festival, an annual poetry festival in Rotterdam, Netherlands
 Poetry International, an annual poetry festival, part of London Literature Festival, founded by Ted Hughes
 Poetry International (magazine), a publication by San Diego State University College of Arts & Letters